Grimes County is a county located in southeastern Texas in the United States. As of the 2020 census, its population was 29,268. The seat of the county is Anderson. The county was formed from Montgomery County in 1846.  It is named for Jesse Grimes, a signer of the Texas Declaration of Independence and early European-American settler of the county.

The Navasota and Brazos Rivers form the western boundary of the county. Eastern areas of the county are part of the watershed of the San Jacinto River.

History
In the historic period, French and Spanish explorers encountered the Bidai Indians, who were mentioned in Spanish records from 1691. Like other tribes, they suffered high fatalities from new infectious diseases caught from the Spanish and joined with the remnants of other Native American people later in the historic period.

The area saw very little settlement by Europeans or creole Spanish during the century of Spanish colonial rule. However, after Mexico gained its independence, it invited settlers from the United States to come to eastern Texas. They were allowed them to practice their own religion, as long as they swore loyalty to the Mexican government.

A few historic buildings in Anderson, such as the Fanthorp Inn, date from this period, as well as some from the Republic of Texas and the early statehood years. For this reason, the town and nearby area have been designated the "Anderson Historic District", which is listed on the National Register of Historic Places.

Anglo-American migration to what became Grimes County began in the 1820s, when it was part of Mexico. Early settlers were primarily from the South, especially Alabama, and many brought enslaved African Americans with them to work the land. The first cotton gin in Texas was built by Jared E. Groce, who arrived with 90 slaves and developed a cotton plantation near today's Hempstead, Texas.

Texas achieved its independence in 1836, and settlers arrived in greater numbers from the United States. The fertile lowlands were initially used for cotton plantations, especially in the late antebellum period.

Grimes County was organized in 1846, one year after the Republic of Texas agreed to be annexed by the United States. From 1850 to the Civil War, the White population steadily increased, since the newcomers continued to bring slaves, the African American population increased even faster. Planters continued to grow cotton and corn as commodity crops. By 1860, 4,852 White inhabitants were in the county, plus 5,468 slaves, who made up 53% of the population. The White population had doubled in the preceding decade, while the slave population had tripled. Grimes had a total of 505 slaveholding families in 1860, with 77 owning 20 slaves or more, that number considered the minimum for major planters. It one of 17 counties in the state where slaveholders held on average, more than 10 slaves each.

In such conditions, Whites were anxious after the emancipation of slaves, and also struggled with adapting to a free labor market. White violence rose after the war, and the Ku Klux Klan established a local chapter in 1868 to assert dominance. Federal troops were stationed in the area and the Freedman's Bureau had an office in the county. They were not successful in protecting freedmen, but the Bureau established schools in the area.

Determined to crush populist efforts and alliances with Republicans that resulted in victories in 1896 and 1898, White Democrats formed what became the White Man's Union, a secret, oath-bound organization that violently took over elections in 1900, after killing several Black Populist leaders. It selected all county officials until 1958.

White violence continued after Reconstruction and into the early 20th century, when Whites committed 9 lynchings of Blacks in the county, part of racial terrorism to suppress the freedmen. Grimes and Freestone Counties had the same number of lynchings in this period, ranking as the fifth-highest totals in a state where lynchings were widespread and conducted in many counties. The economy declined in the late 19th century, increasing social tensions.

In 1859, the Houston and Texas Central extended its line into the county. Anderson, the county seat, rejected it and was bypassed for Navasota, which soon surpassed it in size. Anderson finally got a railroad in the early 1900s, but never caught up with Navasota. In the late 19th and 20th centuries, the Burlington Northern Santa Fe and the Union Pacific became the major railroads in the county.

In response to the violence and takeover by the White Man's Union, African Americans began to leave the county in large numbers. The population of the county declined markedly from 1900 to 1920, and after 1930 to 1980. These were periods of the Great Migration, as African Americans left Texas and other parts of the South to leave behind the oppression of Jim Crow and disenfranchisement, and seek better work. From 1940 on, many migrated to the West Coast for jobs in the expanding defense industry. Rural Whites also left the South for industrial cities.

The county remained mostly rural and agricultural until the late 20th century, which contributed to its continuing population losses. Timber harvesting and processing were part of early industry in the 20th century, but stock raising and dairy farms contributed more to the overall agricultural economy in the later 20th century, making up 93% of its revenues. In addition, crops have become more diversified. Railroad restructuring in the late 20th century resulted in mergers among some lines. In the 21st century, State Highway 90 is the major north–south thoroughfare, and State Highways 30 and 105 run east-west. With some new manufacturing, population began to increase since the late 1970s. In 2014, the census estimated 27,172 people living in Grimes County. About 59.5% were Anglo, 22.6% were Hispanic, and 16.5% were African American.

Geography

Major highways
  State Highway 6
  State Highway 30
  State Highway 90
  State Highway 105
  State Highway 249 a.k.a. Aggie Expressway

Adjacent counties
 Madison County (north)
 Walker County (northeast)
 Montgomery County (southeast)
 Waller County (south)
 Washington County (southwest)
 Brazos County (west)

Demographics

Note: the US Census treats Hispanic/Latino as an ethnic category. This table excludes Latinos from the racial categories and assigns them to a separate category. Hispanics/Latinos can be of any race.

As of the 2000 census,  23,552 people, 7,753 households, and 5,628 families were residing in the county.  The population density was 30 people per square mile (11/km2).  The 9,490 housing units had an average density of 12 per square mile (5/km2).  The racial makeup of the county was 71.79% White, 19.96% African American, 0.32% Native American, 0.30% Asian,  5.98% from other races, and 1.65% from two or more races.  About 16.08% of the population were Hispanics or Latinos of any race.

Christianity is the primary religion in the county and Hinduism is the second.

Of the 7,753 households, 34.6% had children under 18 living with them, 55.4% were married couples living together, 12.6% had a female householder with no husband present, and 27.4% were not families. About 23.8% of all households were made up of individuals, and 11.2% had someone living alone who was 65 or older.  The average household size was 2.69, and the average family size was 3.18.

In the county, the age distribution was 24.8% under 18, 7.7% from 18 to 24, 29.8% from 25 to 44, 24.0% from 45 to 64, and 13.7% who were 65 or older.  The median age was 38 years. For every 100 females, there were 117.50 males.  For every 100 females 18 and over, there were 124.00 males.

The median income for a household in the county was $32,280, and for a family was $38,008. Males had a median income of $30,138 versus $21,747 for females. The per capita income for the county was $14,368.  About 13.8% of families and 16.6% of the population were below the poverty line, including 20.4% of those under 18 and 18.1% of those 65 or over.

Government and infrastructure

County government 
The Grimes County Commissioners Court is the primary decision-making body for the county government. The court is composed of the four county commissioners and is headed by the county judge, who oversees the day-to-day operation of the government. In addition to their policy-making duties, the four commissioners are responsible for road and bridge projects within their precincts. The current county judge, Joe Fauth III, entered office in 2017.

The Grimes County sheriff is the top law enforcement official in the county. The sheriff holds primary law enforcement responsibility over the county's unincorporated areas, and several cities covered under various interlocal agreements. The current sheriff, Donald G. Sowell, has held the office since 1998.

Other elected county officials include:
 The Grimes County district attorney is responsible for prosecuting criminal cases before the state district court.
 The Grimes county attorney represents the county in legal matters.
 The district clerk maintains district court records.
 The county clerk maintains the official county records.
 The county treasurer manages the county government's finances.
 The county tax assessor-collector assesses and collects county property taxes and local fees.
 The county court-at-law judge presides over the county's civil court.
 The justices of the Peace preside over small-claims court matters in their precincts.
 The county constables fill process-serving and peace-officer roles in their precincts.

Texas Department of Criminal Justice facilities 
The Texas Department of Criminal Justice  operates the O.L. Luther Unit and the Wallace Pack Unit in an unincorporated area in Grimes County. In addition, the Pack Warehouse is located in an unincorporated area near the Pack Unit.

Communities

Cities
 Anderson (county seat)
 Bedias
 Iola
 Navasota
 Plantersville
 Todd Mission

Census-designated places
 Pinebrook
 Richards
 Shiro

Unincorporated communities
 Apolonia
 Roans Prairie
 Stoneham
 White Hall

Education
School districts:
 Anderson-Shiro Consolidated Independent School District
 Iola Independent School District
 Madisonville Consolidated Independent School District
 Navasota Independent School District
 Richards Independent School District

Blinn College is the designated community college for all of the county.

Notable residents
 Actor Chuck Norris lives near Navasota, the county's largest city, where his wife and he opened a bottled-water production facility. He starred in the television series Walker, Texas Ranger.

See also
 National Register of Historic Places listings in Grimes County, Texas
 Recorded Texas Historic Landmarks in Grimes County

References

External links
 Grimes County government's website
 

 
1846 establishments in Texas
Populated places established in 1846